Pterolophia phungi is a species of beetle in the family Cerambycidae. It was described by Maurice Pic in 1925.

References

phungi
Beetles described in 1925